Senator Tipton may refer to:

John Tipton (Tennessee frontiersman) (1730–1813), North Carolina State Senate and Tennessee State Senate
John Tipton (1786–1839), U.S. Senator from Indiana from 1832 to 1839
Thomas Tipton (1817–1899), U.S. Senator from Nebraska from 1867 to 1875